The Emms Trophy is presented annually to the regular season champion of the Central division in the Ontario Hockey League. The trophy was inaugurated in the 1975–76 season for the winner of the Emms division, the more westerly of the two divisions at the time. When the league realigned into three divisions in 1994–95, it has since been awarded to the Central division.

The award is named in recognition of Hap Emms. Leighton "Hap" Emms was a coach, team owner, and general manager, with a 33 year presence in the Ontario Hockey Association, as the owner of the Barrie Flyers, Niagara Falls Flyers, and St. Catharines Black Hawks between 1945 and 1978. Teams that Emms coached or owned appeared in eight Memorial Cup tournaments, winning four Memorial Cups.

Winners
List of winners of the Emms trophy.

References

External links
 Ontario Hockey League

Ontario Hockey League trophies and awards
Awards established in 1976